The Ministry of Environment (or MoE), was a Cabinet-level ministry of Government of Pakistan, tasked and primarily responsible for planning, coordinating, promoting, protecting and overseeing the policy implementation of government sanctioned environmental and forestry programmes in the country. Its government activities included conservation, survey of fauna, flora, forestry, wildlife (including Wildflowers); protection and prevention of pollution control, afforestation, and land degradation mitigation. The MoE was also responsible for administrating and establishing the National Parks of Pakistan. 

The ministerial department or MoE was administrated by the Environment Minister of Pakistan who was also a leading member of cabinet of Prime minister of Pakistan. 

The MoE had also contained the separate and autonomous government department— Pakistan Environmental Protection Agency (Pakistan EPA). The EPA is a leading department of the MoE, usually tasked to handle the air pollution, radioactive waste management, promotion of civilian usage of environmental isotopes, while it also has the responsible to implementing and enforcing the Pakistan Environmental Protection Act in the country. 

Pakistan Environmental Protection Agency was an attached department of the Ministry of Environment and responsible to implement the Pakistan Environmental Protection Act, 1997 in the country. An Act to provide for the protection, conservation, rehabilitation and improvement of environment, for the prevention and control of pollution, and promotion of sustainable development. Pakistan Environmental Protection Agency also provides all kind of technical assistance to the Ministry of Environment for formulation of environment policy and programmes.

Former departments
Environmental Protection Agency for Azad Kashmir
EPA for Punjab Province 
EPA for Sindh Province
EPA for Khyber-Pakhtunkhwa Province
EPA for Balochistan Province
EPA for Gilgit-Baltistan

See also 
 Pakistan Environmental Protection Agency

External links 
 Ministry of Environment of Pakistan
 Pakistan Environmental Protection Agency

Environment
Nature conservation in Pakistan
Pakistan
Environment of Pakistan
Forestry in Pakistan
Pakistan